The Temminck's tragopan (Tragopan temminckii) is a medium-sized, approximately 64 cm long,  pheasant in the genus Tragopan. The male is a stocky red-and-orange bird with white-spotted plumage, black bill and pink legs. The male's display features include bare blue facial skin, inflatable dark-blue lappet and horns. The females are a white-spotted brown with blue circular eye skin.

Its appearance resembles the satyr tragopan, but unlike the latter species it has a all red upperbody plumage and an orange collar. The diet consists mainly of berries, grass and plants.

The Temminck's tragopan is found across the mountains of far northeast India, central China, far northern Myanmar to northwestern Tonkin.

Widespread and a common species throughout its large habitat range, the Temminck's tragopan is evaluated as Least Concern on the IUCN Red List of Threatened Species.

This bird's common name and Latin binomial commemorate the Dutch naturalist Coenraad Jacob Temminck.

References

External links 

 ARKive: images and movies of the Temminck's Tragopan (Tragopan temminckii)
 BirdLife Species Factsheet
 Temminck's Tragopan videos on the Internet Bird Collection

Temminck's tragopan
Birds of Central China
Birds of Yunnan
Temminck's tragopan
Temminck's tragopan